Blake Jackson is an American football wide receiver for the Seattle Sea Dragons of the XFL. He played college football at Mary Hardin–Baylor. Jackson has also been a member of the Calgary Stampeders, Cleveland Browns, and Houston Roughnecks.

College career
Jackson played quarterback for Mary Hardin–Baylor.

Professional career

Calgary Stampeders
After going undrafted in the 2018 NFL Draft, Jackson signed with the Calgary Stampeders of the Canadian Football League (CFL) on April 23, 2018. He was released by the Stampeders at the conclusion of training camp.

Cleveland Browns
After attending The Spring League Showcase in La Jolla, California in July 2018, Jackson signed with the Cleveland Browns as a wide receiver on July 27, 2018. He was waived by the Browns on September 1, 2018. The Browns re-signed Jackson to their practice squad on October 16, 2018. Jackson was promoted to the Browns' active 53-man roster on December 28, 2018. He scored his first NFL touchdown against the Detroit Lions.

Jackson was waived with an injury designation on August 2, 2019. After clearing waivers, he was placed on the Browns' injured reserve list. He was later released with an injury settlement.

Houston Roughnecks
In October 2019, Jackson was selected by the Houston Roughnecks in the 2020 XFL Draft. He had his contract terminated when the league suspended operations on April 10, 2020. He played in five games for the Roughnecks, catching five passes for 50 yards and one touchdown.

Winnipeg Blue Bombers
Jackson signed with the Winnipeg Blue Bombers of the Canadian Football League (CFL) on February 25, 2021. Jackson was having a promising training camp with the club in 2021 prior to suffering a season ending injury. He re-signed with the Blue Bombers on January 6, 2022.

Seattle Sea Dragons 
On November 17, 2022, Jackson was drafted by the Seattle Sea Dragons of the XFL.

References

External links
Mary Hardin–Baylor Crusaders bio

Living people
Calgary Stampeders players
Cleveland Browns players
Houston Roughnecks players
Mary Hardin–Baylor Crusaders football players
Players of American football from Houston
Seattle Sea Dragons players
Winnipeg Blue Bombers players
1994 births